William John Hughes MM (1889–1955) was a Welsh professional footballer who played as a right half in the Football League for Newcastle United and Bradford City.

Personal life
Hughes served as a corporal in the Royal Welch Fusiliers during the First World War and won the Military Medal during the course of his service.

Career statistics

Sources

References

English footballers
Halifax Town A.F.C. players
Bradford City A.F.C. players
English Football League players
Association football wing halves
1889 births
1955 deaths
Sportspeople from Rhyl
British Army personnel of World War I
Royal Welch Fusiliers soldiers
Rhyl F.C. players
Newcastle United F.C. players
Huddersfield Town A.F.C. players
Oswestry United F.C. players
Norwich City F.C. players
Barrow A.F.C. players